Hurney is a surname. Notable people with the surname include:

Gary Hurney (born 1980), Irish hurler and Gaelic footballer
Marty Hurney (born 1955), American football executive and journalist

See also
Hurley (surname)
Hurrey